Indian Mountain Air Force Station (AAC ID: F-16, LRR ID: A-03) is a closed United States Air Force General Surveillance Radar station.

The radar surveillance station was closed on 1 November 1983, and was re-designated as a Long Range Radar (LRR) site as part of the Alaska Radar System.  Today, it remains active as part of the Alaska NORAD Region under the jurisdiction of the 611th Air and Space Operations Center, Elmendorf AFB, Alaska. It is one of fifteen Long Range Radar Sites within Alaska maintained and operated by ARCTEC, a subsidiary of Arctic Slope Regional Corporation.

History
Indian Mountain AFS was a continental defence radar station constructed to provide the United States Air Force early warning of an attack by the Soviet Union on Alaska. It was one of the 10 original AC&W surveillance stations constructed as part of the establishment of a permanent air defense system in Alaska during the early 1950s. 

Construction of the station, began in September 1950 and was completed in November 1953. The Army Corps of Engineers undertook the project. The location of the station made construction a challenge. Military engineer construction personnel built a 9.1 mile road to the top of the mountain where the radars were located (upper camp) and a base station and airstrip (lower camp). The lower camp , located at the confluence of the Indian River and Utopia Creek, included a runway opened in May 1952 with a 12-percent slope, the steepest remote site runway. The upper camp, at the summit of Indian Mountain (elevation 4,234 feet), could be reached by the road.

The station consisted of a power/heating plant, water and fuel storage tanks, gymnasium and other support office buildings. Two other buildings contained living quarters, work areas, and recreational facilities plus opportunities for such sports as skiing, skating, horseshoes, and basketball. The station buildings were, except for the civil engineering building connected by heated hallways. As a result, personnel stationed there, with only very few exceptions, were able to wear "summer" uniforms year round, unless they had a need to go outside during the winter season. The coverings of the station's three radar towers were heated from within to keep the covering from becoming brittle from extreme cold, and thus subject to being damaged or destroyed by high winds. Tours at the station were limited to one year because of the psychological strain and physical hardships.

The airstrip was adjacent to the station, a 4,100' gravel/dirt airstrip capable for medium transport (C-119, C-123, C-130) aircraft to fly in supplies, equipment, mail and personnel. Mail was usually delivered twice a week. The inaccessibility made the personnel at the site responsible for maintenance if anything went wrong. Water mains occasionally froze and ruptured.

The 708th Aircraft Control and Warning Squadron (AC&W Sq), activated in November 1953, provided information 24/7 to the air defense Direction Center at Murphy Dome AFS near Fairbanks, where it was analyzed to determine range, direction altitude speed and whether or not aircraft were friendly or hostile. Radars operated at the station were an AN/FPS-3, AN/FPS-20, AN/FPS-6, and an AN/PS-6B.

Communications were initially provided by a high frequency radio system which proved unreliable because of atmospheric disturbances. The Alaskan Air Command (AAC), after investigating various options, decided to build the White Alice Communications System, a system of Air Force-owned tropospheric scatter and microwave radio relay sites operated by the Air Force Communications Service (AFCS). The Indian Mountain site  was located near the top camp radars and was activated in 1957. It was inactivated in 1979, and replaced by an Alascom owned and operated satellite earth terminal as part of an Air Force plan to divest itself of the obsolete White Alice Communications System and transfer the responsibility to a commercial firm.(Peymann)

Over the years, the equipment at the station was upgraded or modified to improve the efficiency and accuracy of the information gathered by the radars. In 1983, Indian Mountain AFS received a new AN/FPS-117 minimally attended radar under Alaskan Air Command's SEEK IGLOO program. It was designed to transmit aircraft tracking data via satellite to the Alaskan NORAD Regional Operations Control Center (ROCC) at Elmendorf AFB. 

No longer needed, the 708th AC&W Sq was inactivated on l November 1983 and the station re-designated as a Long Range Radar (LRR) Site.  In 1990, jurisdiction of the Indian Mountain LRR Site was transferred to Pacific Air Forces' (PACAF)Eleventh Air Force with the redesignation of AAC. 

In 1998 PACAF initiated "Operation Clean Sweep", in which abandoned Cold War stations in Alaska were remediated and the land restored to its previous state. After years of neglect the facilities at the station had lost any value they had when the site was closed. The site remediation of the radar, support and White Alice communication station was carried out by the 611th Civil Engineering Squadron at Elmendorf AFB, and remediation work was completed by 2005.

Current status
Today very little of the former Indian Mountain Air Force Station remains. The site is controlled by PACAF's 611th Air and Space Operations Center, based at Elmendorf AFB. The site is generally unattended; a few civilian contractors that access the site by former support airstrip, now the Indian Mountain LRRS Airport  and provide maintenance and support when needed to maintain the radar system.

Site is continuously attended by contractors to maintain the runway, power station, roads, buildings, radar and facilities.

Air Force units and assignments

Units 
 708th Aircraft Control and Warning Squadron
 Activated, 8 December 1952
 Inactivated, 1 November 1983

Assignments
 160th Aircraft Control and Warning Group, 8 December 1952
 548th Aircraft Control and Warning Group, 5 February 1953
 11th Air Division, 18 April 1953
 5001st Air Defense Group 20 September 1954
 10th Air Division, 1 October 1955
 5060th Aircraft Control and Warning Group, 1 November 1957
 11th Air Division, ca. 1 July 1959
 5070th Air Defense Wing, 1 August 1960
 Alaskan Air Command, 1 November 1961
 708th Aircraft Control and Warning Squadron, 1961
 531st Aircraft Control and Warning Group (later 11th Tactical Control Group, 11th Tactical Control Wing, 11th Air Control Wing, 611th Air Operations Group, 611th Air and Space Operations Center) 15 July 1977
 807th Engineer Aviation Battalion
 925th Engineer Aviation Group

References

 Alaskan Air Defenses
 Information for Indian Mountain AFS, AK

Installations of the United States Air Force in Alaska
Radar stations of the United States Air Force
Buildings and structures in Yukon–Koyukuk Census Area, Alaska
1951 establishments in Alaska
Military installations closed in 1983
Military installations established in 1951
1983 disestablishments in Alaska